Ernest Cadine (12 July 1893 – 20 May 1978) was a French weightlifter who won a gold medal at the 1920 Summer Olympics in Antwerp.

As a teenager Cadine trained in gymnastics, wrestling, weightlifting and swimming. He finished third in the national middleweight weightlifting championships before World War I. During the war he served with an artillery regiment. In 1920 he won the light-heavyweight gold medals at the national championships and Olympic games and did not compete internationally afterwards. In 1920–1925 he set six world records: three in the snatch and three in clean and jerk, and later became a professional weightlifting showman. In 1978, he received the French National Order of Merit.

References

External links
 

1893 births
1978 deaths
French male weightlifters
Olympic weightlifters of France
Weightlifters at the 1920 Summer Olympics
Olympic gold medalists for France
Olympic medalists in weightlifting
Knights of the Ordre national du Mérite
Medalists at the 1920 Summer Olympics
People associated with physical culture